The Breedlove House and Water Tower are a historic residential property on the south side Benton County Route 4 east of Bentonville, Arkansas, about  east of its junction with Arkansas Highway 72.  The two-story house is a c. 1887 brick structure that was enlarged and restyled c. 1907, giving it a mix of original Italianate and Eastlake detailing, and a front Colonial Revival two-story porch.  The property includes a  square brick tower, built c. 1920 as a water supply for an apple orchard.  The tower is the only structure surviving in the county from the period known to be associated with the then-significant apple industry.

The property was listed on the National Register of Historic Places in 1988.

See also
National Register of Historic Places listings in Benton County, Arkansas

References

Houses on the National Register of Historic Places in Arkansas
Victorian architecture in Arkansas
Neoclassical architecture in Arkansas
Houses completed in 1887
Houses in Bentonville, Arkansas
National Register of Historic Places in Benton County, Arkansas
Water towers on the National Register of Historic Places in Arkansas
1887 establishments in Arkansas
Apple production
1920 establishments in Arkansas
Infrastructure completed in 1920